The Central Asian Flyway (CAF), Central Asian-Indian Flyway, or Central Asian-South Asian Flyway is a flyway covering a large continental area of Eurasia between the Arctic Ocean and the Indian Ocean and the associated island chains. The CAF comprises several important migration routes of waterbirds, most of which extend from the northernmost breeding grounds in Siberia to the southernmost non-breeding wintering grounds in West Asia, India, the Maldives and the British Indian Ocean Territory.

Range
The concept of flyway is essentially an operational concept linked to waterfowl whose populations one wishes to manage over their entire migration space.

The CAF range is essentially centred on one of the three major wintering areas of waterfowl in the Old World, namely the Indian subcontinent, the other two being Africa, in territory of the African-Eurasian Flyway (AEWA) to the west, and south-east Asia in the East Asian – Australasian Flyway (EAAF) to the east. These wintering areas are geographically separate, and present entirely different ecological, historical and cultural situations.

The flyway covers 30 countries of North, Central and South Asia and Trans-Caucasus. The northern catchment area of CAF inevitably overlaps, and considerably overlaps, with both those of AEWA and EAAF, mostly within a single country, the Russian Federation, though sixteen of the 30 countries encompassed by the CAF are located in the AEWA area. They are: Afghanistan, Armenia, Azerbaijan, Bahrain, China, Georgia, Iran Republic of, Kazakhstan, Mongolia, Pakistan, Russian Federation, Saudi Arabia, Sri Lanka, Tajikistan, Turkmenistan, United Arab Emirates, United Kingdom Chagos Islands and Uzbekistan.

The remaining countries in the Central Asian Flyway are: Bangladesh, Bhutan, India, Iraq, Kuwait, Kyrgyzstan, Maldives, Myanmar, Nepal, Oman, Qatar and Yemen.

Species
The Central Asian Flyway covers at least 279 migratory waterbird populations of 182 species,
including 29 globally threatened species and near-threatened species that breed, migrate and spend the non-breeding winter period within the region. Species such as the

critically endangered - northern bald ibis, white-bellied heron, Baer's pochard and
endangered - greater adjutant and
vulnerable - black-necked crane, Indian skimmer, lesser adjutant, masked finfoot, Socotra cormorant, wood snipe and
near threatened - black-headed ibis, lesser flamingo, pygmy cormorant, white-eyed gull are completely or largely restricted to the Central Asian Flyway range.
In addition, the breeding range of some species including the
critically endangered - Siberian crane, slender-billed curlew, sociable lapwing, spoon-billed sandpiper and
endangered - red-breasted goose, Nordmann's greenshank, white-headed duck and
vulnerable - spot-billed pelican, Dalmatian pelican, lesser white-fronted goose, marbled duck, relict gull, and
near-threatened - black-winged pratincole, ferruginous duck, corn crake and Asian dowitcher are largely restricted to the region although the non-breeding ranges overlap with adjoining flyways.

Conservation

Regional cooperation among the Central Asian Flyway states is undertaken to promote the conservation of migratory waterbirds and their habitats. This includes various international conventions including Central Asian Waterbirds Flyway Action Plan, Convention on the Conservation of Migratory Species (CMS), Agreement on the Conservation of African-Eurasian Migratory Waterbirds (AEWA), 
Convention on Wetlands of International Importance (Ramsar) and Convention on Biological Diversity (CBD) and development agencies including United Nations Environment Programme (UNEP), United Nations Development Programme (UNDP), World Bank and Asian Development Bank (ADB) and international Non-governmental organizations including BirdLife International, World Conservation Union (IUCN), World Wide Fund for Nature (WWF) and Wetlands International who all cooperate on regional and national wildlife conservation.

Regional plans complement actions that are being undertaken by national governments to promote conservation. Several countries have well established protected areas to conserve important habitats for migratory waterbirds.
Bangladesh

According to the Ramsar definition, more than two-thirds of the country's landmass may be classified
as wetlands. It is a country dominated by wetland including estuaries, mangrove swamps namely the Sundarbans, freshwater 
marshes such as haor, swamps and rivers. There are about 628 bird species in Bangladesh, of which 244 are Migratory. About 100 species of migratory birds regularly or occasionally visit the country. Considering the present threats to waterbird conservation in the country, 31 migratory waterbird species are of high priority for future action for conservation. 14 of these species are threatened.

The wetlands are home to about 70 species of resident waterbirds including ducks, grebe, cormorants, bitterns, herons, egrets, storks, rails, jacanas, finfoot, waders, gulls, turns and skimmers. Eleven species of resident waterbirds are identified as threatened. The important threatened species are masked finfoot, Indian skimmer, black-headed ibis, greater adjutant, lesser adjutant, Baikal teal, Baer's pochard, ferruginous pochard, wood snipe, Nordmann's greenshank and spoon-billed sandpiper.

The wetlands of Bangladesh are being degraded rapidly due to population pressure, withdrawal of water for irrigation, destruction of swamp forest and many other anthropogenic and natural causes. Large scale habitat conversion, unsustainable harvesting policies and lack of ecological considerations have led to the destruction of valuable wetland habitat for water birds and other associated biodiversity. Immediate action is required for restoring these habitats and conserving the water birds in Bangladesh.

The Key breeding and staging areas of Bangladesh are: Haor areas such as the Meghna estuary, Tanguar haor and Hail-Hakaluki haors, Chalan Beel, the Sundarbans and other coastal mangroves including Hatia and Nijhum Dweep, haor areas of the north west and off shore Islands.

The Sundarbans mangrove forest of Bangladesh are included within  of 3 Wildlife sanctuaries which are part of the Sunderbans World Heritage Site. The Ministry of Environment and Forests (MoEF) through its Department of Environment and Forest Department 'Wildlife Management and Nature Conservation Circle' is the main institutional structure for wildlife conservation including waterbirds and their habitats. The Ministry of Land is the legal authority for land management including wetlands.

Bangladesh is signatory to CBD, CMS, CITES and Ramsar Convention. No national level initiative has been taken for waterbirds. But self-funded waterbird census is undertaken each year in selected habitats.
India
India is the core country of the CAF and supports 257 species of water birds. Of these, 81 species are migratory birds of CAF conservation concern, including three critically endangered species, six endangered species and 13 near threatened species. The Ministry of Environment and Forests is the nodal agency for developing strategy and action plans and managing national, regional and international programmes on water birds and wetlands conservation. Implementation of action plans is through the states environment and forests agencies with complementing activities provided by many academic institutions, NGO-conservation organizations, professional institutions and international agencies.
National government institutions involved in migratory waterbirds and wetlands research/management include:. Zoological Survey of India, Sálim Ali Centre for Ornithology and Natural History, Wildlife Institute of India, Indian Institute of Forest Management, Centre for Environment Education, Indian Institute of Economic Growth, Indira Gandhi Institute of Development Research and the Indian Council of Agricultural Research.The Bombay Natural History Society is the foremost NGO in India working on water birds and wetlands. India has identified more than 300 potential Ramsar sites, of which 25 have been implemented.
India is notable among CAF countries, with an extensive series of important bird areas and protected areas including bird sanctuaries, wildlife sanctuaries and national parks in wetlands that provide convenient stopover and wintering areas for migratory birds using the Central Asian Flyway.

Listed from north to south along the Eastern Flyway on or near the east coast, these include: Bhitarkanika Wildlife Sanctuary and National Park, Chandka-Dampara Wildlife Sanctuary, Mangal Jodi Nalabana Bird Sanctuary, Coringa Wildlife Sanctuary and Godavari estuary, Kolleru Lake Wildlife Sanctuary, Nellapattu Bird Sanctuary, Pulicat Lake Bird Sanctuary, Guindy National Park, Kaliveli Tank and Yeduyanthittu estuary, Bahour Lake, Point Calimere Wildlife and Bird Sanctuary, Karaivetti Wildlife Sanctuary, Big Tank (Peria Kanmai) and Sakkarakotai Kanma, Chitrangudi Bird Sanctuary and Kanjirankulam Bird Sanctuary, Gulf of Mannar Marine National Park and Kunthangulam Bird Sanctuary

Sanctuaries for migratory waterbirds listed from north to south along the Western Flyway on or near the west coast of India include: Rann of Kutch, Flamingo City, Banni Grassland and Chhari Dhand, Naliya Grassland, Lala Bustard Wildlife Sanctuary, Porbandar Bird Sanctuary, Khijadiya Lake and Bird Sanctuary, Marine National Park and Wildlife Sanctuary, Charakla Salt Works, Nal Sarovar Bird Sanctuary, Blackbuck National Park, Velavadar, Gir National Park and Wildlife Sanctuary, Kaj Lake Pipalava Bandharo, Bhimashankar Wildlife Sanctuary, Mahul - Sewree Creek, Sanjay Gandhi National Park, Koyna Wildlife Sanctuary, Burnt Island (Bandra) Vengurla Rocks, Carambolim Wetlands, Bhagwan Mahavir Wildlife Sanctuary, Cotigao Wildlife Sanctuary, Anshi National Park, Gudavi Bird Sanctuary, Kudremukh National Park, Bhadra Wildlife Sanctuary, Bramhagiri Wildlife Sanctuary, Aralam Wildlife Sanctuary, Kattampally, Nilgiri Biosphere Reserve including: Mukurthi National Park, Mudumalai National Park, Wynad Wildlife Sanctuary, Bandipur National Park and Silent Valley National Park, Indira Gandhi Wildlife Sanctuary and National Park, Periyar National Park, Kole Wetland, Neyyar Wildlife Sanctuary and Suchindram Theroor Birds Sanctuary, the southernmost protected area in the continental range of the Central Asian Flyway
Pakistan
Pakistan has had very few studies to monitor the migratory bird populations and their use of wetlands. Current flyway management systems rely on information from local hunters, erratic wildlife surveys and raw estimates.

Key wetland sites include Mangla Lake, Rawal Lake in Margalla Hills National Park, Zangi Nawar Lake, the high mountain wetlands in northern Pakistan including the Naltar wetland complex and the wetlands of Deosai National Park plains. There have been several reports of black storks, cranes and flocks of vulnerable marbled teal.

World Wide Fund for Nature reported that Pakistan's wetlands and their rich biological resources are threatened by over-exploitation, habitat destruction and polluted environments. The main causes for wetland degradation are ineffective management, poor stakeholder participation and lack of coordination for management strategies.
Russia
About half the territory of the Russian Federation is in the range of the Central-Asian Flyway. Among 176 CAF species, 143 (85%) are located (and mostly breed) in Russian territory. Most of the species are presented by Anatidae and wader groups. 37 species that inhabit CAF area are included in the Russian Red Data Book and more than 40 species are hunting objects.
Sri Lanka

Sri Lanka is the southernmost land mass of the Central Asian Flyway and is the final destination of many migratory birds exiting the eastern and western Indian flyways and the Andaman Islands. The Department of Wildlife Conservation in Sri Lanka has declared four Ramsar sites and declared other protected areas in Sri Lanka which are wetlands habitats of migratory waterbirds. These include: Anawilundawa Sanctuary, Bellanwilla - Attidiya Sanctuary, Bundala National Park, Gal Oya National Park, Giants' Tank Sanctuary, Kumana National Park, Muthurajawela Sanctuary and Yala National Park.

Additional sources
CMS Secretariat Launches Action Plan For Central Flyway
 Wetlands Biodiversity and Waterbirds: the Central Asian Flyway initiative, including Map of the Central Asian Flyway
Flyway conservation in the Central Asian Flyway

External links
 Central Asia/South Asia Factsheet from BirdLife International

References

Bird migration flyways
ˇ
.
ˇ
ˇ
ˇ
.
ˇ
ˇ
International environmental organizations